Wadding is a disc of material used in guns to seal gas behind a projectile or to separate powder from shot.  It may also refer to:

Wadding may also refer to:

 Batting (material), a layer of insulation used in quilting between a top layer of patchwork and a bottom layer of backing material
 Wadding (surname)

See also 
 WAD (disambiguation)